Kurrawang is a medium-sized Aboriginal community, located 12 km south-west of Kalgoorlie in the state of Western Australia, within the Goldfields-Esperance region of Western Australia.

Kurrawang is a strong community hosting a range of facilities including school, shop, adult learning centre and workshops.

History 
Kurrawang was established as a mission settlement in 1953 on a Crown Land Title reserve. During the 1960s Kurrawang set up dormitories for children. In the 1970s the dormitories were replaced with a detached housing accommodation system. In 1984 mission control was replaced by a community based executive committee. In March 1995 the Kurrawang Aboriginal Christian Community was issued with the title to land in freehold.

Town planning 
Kurrawang Layout Plan No.2 has been prepared in accordance with State Planning Policy 3.2 Aboriginal Settlements. Layout Plan No.2 was endorsed by the community on 7 February 2006 and the Western Australian Planning Commission on 21 March 2006. The Layout Plan map-set and background report can be viewed at Planning Western Australia's website.

References

 Kurrawang Aboriginal Christian Centre, Mount Burgess, Western Australia - Circa 1973-1974. Family photos.
 Short history of Kurrawang Mission / Kurrawang Aboriginal Christian Community, plus photos.
 Photos of Kurrawang Mission held by the State Library of Western Australia.

Aboriginal communities in Goldfields-Esperance